"Throw Sum Mo" is a song by American hip hop duo Rae Sremmurd featuring rappers Nicki Minaj and Young Thug. It was released on December 9, 2014, by EarDrummers Entertainment and Interscope Records, as the third single from the duo's debut studio album, SremmLife (2015). The song was produced by Mike Will Made-It and Soundz. The music video for the song was released on March 15, 2015. The song was nominated for the Coca-Cola Viewers' Choice Award at the BET Awards 2015.

Music video
The video features Rae Sremmurd in a skating rink with Nicki Minaj and Young Thug, along with cameo appearances from Mike Will Made It, Birdman and Migos.

Credits and personnel
Credits adapted from SremmLife booklet.

Song credits

Writing – Aaquil Brown, Khalif Brown, Kenneth Coby, Michael Williams II, Jeremih, Onika Maraj, Jeffery Williams
Production – Soundz and Mike Will Made It
Recording – Stephen Hybicki at Mean Street Studios in Atlanta, Georgia and P-Nazty at Ear Druma Studios in Atlanta, Georgia
Nicki Minaj verse recording – Aubry "Big Juice" Delaine at Glenwood Place Studios in Burbank, California
Nicki Minaj verse recording assistant – Todd Bergman
Audio mixing – Jaycen Joshua and Mike Will Made It at Larrabee Sound Studios in North Hollywood, California
Assistant mix engineering – Maddox Chhim and Ryand Kaul
Mastering – Dave Kutch, The Mastering Palace, New York City

Charts

Certifications

References 

2014 singles
2014 songs
Interscope Records singles
Nicki Minaj songs
Rae Sremmurd songs
Songs written by Swae Lee
Songs written by Nicki Minaj
Songs written by Soundz
Young Thug songs
Songs written by Young Thug
Songs written by Slim Jxmmi
Songs written by Mike Will Made It
Songs written by Jeremih